The Heyburn Building is a 17-floor, 250-foot (76-m) building in downtown Louisville, Kentucky, United States. In the early 20th century, it was an integral part of the "magic corner" of Fourth Street and Broadway, which rivaled Main Street as Louisville's business district.  It occupies the lot that was the location of the Avery mansion, home of Louisville suffragist, Susan Look Avery. This block of West Broadway had been a posh residential corridor prior to the commercial transition of which the Heyburn Building composed a part.

The Classical Revival-style Heyburn Building was completed in 1928. It was built by and named for William R. Heyburn, president of Belknap Hardware and Manufacturing Company. It was designed by the Graham, Anderson, Probst & White firm of Chicago. It was the tallest building in Kentucky until a vertical addition of the defunct Commonwealth Building was completed in 1955.

The Heyburn Building has since gone through several owners and renovations, the largest of which occurred in 1983 at a cost of $6 million. It was added to the National Register of Historic Places in 1979.

On January 21, 2010, a man committed suicide by jumping to his death from the building's top floor.

References

External links
Building page on Emporis

Skyscraper office buildings in Louisville, Kentucky
Office buildings completed in 1928
1928 establishments in Kentucky
National Register of Historic Places in Louisville, Kentucky
Commercial buildings on the National Register of Historic Places in Kentucky
Office buildings on the National Register of Historic Places
Neoclassical architecture in Kentucky